Ghulam Bibi Bharwana (born 5 May 1977) is a Pakistani politician who has been a member of the National Assembly of Pakistan, since August 2018. Previously she was a member of the National Assembly from 2002 to May 2018.

Early life
She was born on 5 May 1977.

She received her Bachelor of Arts degree from Lahore College for Women and the Bachelor of Laws degree from the University of Punjab.

Political career
She was elected to the National Assembly of Pakistan as a candidate of Pakistan Muslim League (Q) (PML-Q) from Constituency NA-87 (Jhang-II) in 2002 Pakistani general election. She served as Minister of State for Education.

She was re-elected to the National Assembly as a candidate of PML-Q from Constituency NA-87 (Jhang-II) in 2008 Pakistani general election.

She was re-elected to the National Assembly as a candidate of Pakistan Muslim League (N) from Constituency NA-88 (Jhang-III) in 2013 Pakistani general election. She announced to resign from her National Assembly seat in protest in December 2017.

In May 2018, she quit PML-N and joined Pakistan Tehreek-e-Insaf (PTI).

She was re-elected to the National Assembly as a candidate of PTI from Constituency NA-115 (Jhang-II) in 2018 Pakistani general election.

References 

Living people
1977 births
21st-century Pakistani women politicians
Pakistani MNAs 2002–2007
Pakistani MNAs 2008–2013
Pakistani MNAs 2013–2018
Pakistani MNAs 2018–2023
Pakistan Muslim League (Q) MNAs
Pakistan Muslim League (N) MNAs
Pakistan Tehreek-e-Insaf MNAs
Women members of the National Assembly of Pakistan
People from Jhang District